Coded Cultures is a conference and festival series developed by the Austrian artist collective 5uper.net and since 2016 is included in the Research Institute for Arts and Technology. The first Coded Cultures focused on the theme 'Decoding Digital Culture' and took place over two weeks in May 2004 at the Museumsquartier in Vienna. The 2009 version of the conference and festival was a bi-national event that took part in Austria and Japan as part of the official "Japan - Austria Friendship Year 2009". Further implementations of the festival have discussed topics such as Open Source Hardware, Right to repair, New media art and digital art in cooperation with the apertus AXIOM project and the University of Applied Arts Vienna, the Transmediale Festival and the ISEA (International Symposium on Electronic Art). 

Coded Cultures has debated topics publicly, and many international artists, researchers and academics such as Marina Gržinić, Masaki Fujihata, Christa Sommerer, Hans Bernhard and many others have discussed the history, past and future of Coded Cultures.

Festivals, conferences and implementations

Publications
 Coded Cultures: New Creative Practices out of Diversity (2011)  
 Coded Cultures: City as Interface, 5uper.net (2011)  
 Coded Cultures: Exploring Creative Emergences (2009)

References

New media art festivals
Arts festivals in Austria
Recurring events established in 2004
Festivals in Vienna
Spring (season) events in Austria